Nicholas Piers Huxley Hillman (known as Nick Hillman, born Banbury, Oxfordshire, 21 April 1972) is an English higher education policy adviser, previously a school history teacher and special adviser for the Conservatives. He has been the director of the Higher Education Policy Institute since 2014.

Career
Hillman studied as an undergraduate at the University of Manchester. He taught English at the University of Bucharest in Romania in 1992, then gained a PGCE in history at Christ's College, Cambridge before teaching history at St Paul's School, London from 1995–1998. He received an MA in contemporary British history at Queen Mary University of London, before going into politics. He worked on pensions policy for the Association of British Insurers from 2003–7, before returning to politics.

Since January 2014 he has been the director of a think tank, the Higher Education Policy Institute in Oxford.

Since 2016 he has been on the board of governors of his alma mater, the University of Manchester, and he became a fellow of another alma mater, QMUL, in 2016. From 2015-18 he was a school governor at Haddenham St Mary's. He has been a trustee of the National Foundation for Educational Research since April 2018 and he is a member of the Higher Education Policy Development Group at the British Academy. He was previously a research fellow with Policy Exchange.

Politics
Hillman worked for Conservative MP David Willetts, first as a Senior Research Officer from 2000–3, then from 2007 to 2010 as his chief of staff, and finally from 2010 to 2013 in the Department for Business, Innovation and Skills as a special adviser when Willets was Science Minister. As a special adviser Hillman helped introduce higher university tuition fees.

Hillman stood for the Conservatives in the 2002 local elections in Hammersmith Broadway Ward, coming sixth in a three-seat election with 528 votes. He was the Conservative parliamentary candidate for Cambridge in 2010, selected from six candidates in an open primary in December 2009 after Richard Normington stepped down as candidate. A fundraising dinner was supported by Clarissa Dickson-Wright. He represented himself as a "liberal Tory", but The Independent reported he was "not getting much help from the party's big guns". Hillman came second behind the Liberal Democrat Julian Huppert with 12,829 votes.

Personal life
Hillman grew up in Banbury. He met his wife while they were undergraduates and they married in Cambridge. While a teacher in London he lived in Covent Garden. They have children and live in Haddenham, Buckingham.

Works
 Adam Bogdanor, David Willetts MP, Nicholas Hillman, Left Out, Left Behind. Policy Exchange, 2003
 David Willetts and Nicholas Hillman, Tax Credits: Do They Add Up? Politeia, 2002
 Nicholas Hillman; Edited by Dr Oliver Marc Hartwich, Quelling the Pensions Storm: Lessons from the past, March 20, 2008
 The Guardian columnist
 Nicholas Hillman, "Public schools and the Fleming report of 1944: shunting the first-class carriage on to an immense siding?." History of Education 41#2 (2012): 235–255.

References

External links
 HEPI profile
 2010 election page (archived version)

Living people
British special advisers
1972 births
Alumni of the University of Manchester
Alumni of Christ's College, Cambridge
Alumni of Queen Mary University of London
People from Banbury
People from Aylesbury Vale
Schoolteachers from Oxfordshire
20th-century English educators
English educational theorists
British lobbyists
Higher education in the United Kingdom
Conservative Party (UK) parliamentary candidates